CoRoT-21b is a transiting exoplanet reportedly found by the CoRoT space telescope in 2011. Planetary parameters were published in 2012.

It is an extremely hot Jupiter-like planet with an orbital period of 2.72 earth days. Its mass is equivalent to 2.26 Jupiter masses, 1.3 Jupiter radius, and has a density of 1.37 g/cm3. CoRoT-21b orbits a F8IV star with Te = 6200K, M = 1.29M☉, R = 1.945, and near-solar metallicity. It has an estimated age between 3.6 and 4.6 Gyr. 

The planet is experiencing an extreme tidal forces forcing its orbit to decay within 800 million years from now.

References

Hot Jupiters
Transiting exoplanets
Exoplanets discovered in 2011
21b
Monoceros (constellation)